The 2021–22 season was Wydad Athletic Club's 82nd season in existence and the club's 66th consecutive season in the top flight of Moroccan football. Wydad participated in this season's edition of the Botola, the Champions League and the Throne Cup. The season covered the period from 12 September 2021 to 28 July 2022.

Players

First-team squad

Transfers

In

Out

Pre-season and friendlies

Competitions

Overview

Botola

League table

Results summary

Results by round

Matches

Moroccan Throne Cup

CAF Champions League

Qualifying rounds

Second round

Group stage

Group D

Knockout stage

Quarter-finals

Semi-finals

Final

Statistics

Goalscorers 

*Italic: Left the team.

Notes

References 

Wydad AC seasons
2021–22 CAF Champions League participants seasons
Football in Morocco